Zhumadian railway station is a station on Beijing–Guangzhou railway in Yicheng District, Zhumadian, Henan.

History
The station was established in 1903.

Passenger services were resumed from 28 December 2017.

Station layout
The station has 3 platforms (1 side platform and 1 island platform) and 8 tracks. The station building is to the west of the platforms and the freight yard is to the east. According to the plan, the freight yard will be removed to make room for the east station building in the future.

See also
Zhumadian West railway station: the high-speed railway station for Zhumadian.

References

Railway stations in Henan
Stations on the Beijing–Guangzhou Railway
Railway stations in China opened in 1903